Renaissance Recordings is a British record label, founded by the club Renaissance in 1994. It went into administration in September 2010 and the back catalogue was sold to Phoenix Music International Ltd.
After a year of inactivity, in July 2011 it was announced that Renaissance had been reborn, with founder and original owner Geoff Oakes once again guiding the brand. In 2018, media and finance entrepreneur Scott Rudmann acquired a majority stake in the label and began working in partnership with Oakes. After a large period of activity, they ceased operations once again on 23 September 2014. In July 2017, they released a new digital remix of Age of Love's song "The Age of Love" by Solomun that went to world no1 on the electronic music charts.

Beginning in 2018, the label has released a series of remixes by leading electronic music producers, all of which went to a chart position of no1, no2, or no3, including Cafe del Mar (Tale of Us remix, Bladerunner (Maceo Plex remix), Sacred Cycles (Adam Beyer and Bart Skills remix).

The label has relaunched its singles output in 2019 and 2020.

Sublabels
emFire
USR (Underground Sound of Renaissance)
Bauhaus (commenced in January 2023)

Catalogue

Series

Current
3D
Digital
Masters Series
Mix Collections
Sequential
Sidetracked
The Sound of Renaissance
This Is...
Transitions
Viva
Focus On
Platform

Discontinued
Anthems
Frontiers
Ibiza
James Zabiela
Nic Fanciulli
Progression
Silk
Therapy Sessions
Worldwide
Presents...

Albums, compilations and DJ mixes

Mix Collection
RENMIX1CD Sasha & Digweed - Renaissance: The Mix Collection (3xCD) Release Release Date: 14 October 1994
RENMIX2CD John Digweed - Renaissance: The Mix Collection Part 2 (3xCD) Release Date: 14 September 1995
RENMIX3CD Fathers of Sound - Renaissance: The Mix Collection Part 3 (3xCD) Release Date: 14 May 1996
RENMIX4CD Dave Seaman & Ian Ossia - Renaissance: The Mix Collection Part 4 (3xCD) Release Date: 14 October 1996

Digital Mix
RENDIGMIX1 Paolo Mojo - Renaissance Digital 01 (File, MP3) Release Date: 3 September 2007

Silk Mix
S RENAISSANCE 01 Various - The Silk Mix (CD) Release Date: 1996

World Wide Mix
RENWW1CD Dave Seaman & Robert Miles - Renaissance Worldwide: London (2xCD) Release Date: 14 April 1997
RENWW2CD David Morales, Dave Seaman & BT - Renaissance Worldwide: Singapore (3xCD) Release Date: 14 October 1997

Presents
RENUK1CD Ian Ossia & Nigel Dawson - Renaissance Presents... Volume One(2xCD) Release Date: 1998
RENUK2CD Anthony Pappa & Rennie Pilgrem - Renaissance Presents... Volume Two(2xCD) Release Date: 1999

Focus On
RENFOC1 Neil Quigley - Focus On: Renaissance (1xCD) Release Date: 7 September 2009 (was never released on CD according to Neil Quigley himself)

Vinyl

RENX001 Fathers of Sound Featuring Sharon May Lynn - Water
RENX001 Sandstorm - The Return of Nothing
RENX002 BT - Godspeed
RENX002 Freefall Featuring Jan Johnston - Skydive
RENX003 Memnon Featuring Seroya - Desire
RENX004 PQM Featuring Cica - The Flying Song
RENX005 Human Movement - Love Has Come Again
RENX006 Luzon - The Baguio Track
RENX007 H-Two - Release
RENX007 Polekat - Dancing Queen (You Know What I Mean?)
RENX008 JSJ - Deep Love 9
RENX009 Origin - Rage/Refined Intricacy
RENX010 Science Department - Breathe
RENX011 Luzon - Underground Sound of Renaissance EP Special Edition
RENX012 Pure Funk - Elektrik
RENX013 JSJ - Ghost of You
RENX014 Angel Moraes - Turn It Up
RENX015 H-Two Burnin' - Fire
RENX016 I-Jack - Falling
RENX016 When Is Dark - The Love You Need (Part 1)
RENX017 Latoro - Electric Sky
RENR018 Origin - Killing Me
RENX019 Trendroid Presents CMPM - Rastafari
RENX020 The Mud Men - Mud Chant
RENX021 Sharpside - Belgian Resistance 2004
RENX022 Montero - Brazilia
RENX023 21st Century Planet Smashers - Underground Night Music
RENX024 Randall Jones - Cultural Assertion
RENX025 Aldrin & Akien - Maybe Tomorrow
RENX026 Sound Alliance - Instead of ...
RENX027 Chris Cargo - Cityscape
RENX028 Bionic Rockers - Code 0320
RENX029 James Zabiela - Utilities
RENX030 Montero - Captain Hook
RENX031 The Skeleton Key - The Conjure
RENX032 Nic Fanciulli - The Squirreled
RENX033 PJ Davy - Bollyfella
RENX034 Phonique - For The Time Being
RENX035 Last Rhythm - Last Rhythm
RENX035OMT Last Rhythm - Last Rhythm (Tom Middleton Remodel)
RENX036 Montero - Hairy Hits
RENX037 Hernán Cattáneo & John Tonks - Sirocco
RENX038 Cult 45 - True To Life
RENX039 Nic Fanciulli - Lucky Heather & Cat Out of The Bag
RENX040 James Zabiela - Weird Science
RENX041 Sarah McLeod - He Doesn't Love You

RENX042 Charlie May vs. Sasha - Seal Clubbing
RENX043 Shlomi Abe Pres. Bao Crop Duster
RENX044 Marcella - Stabbing Sally
RENX045 Blue Foundation - Sweep
RENX046 Solaris Heights - Vice
RENX047 Martin Eyerer & Stephan Hinz - The Tucan
RENX048 James Zabiela - Human
RENX049 Shlomi Aber Feat. Lemon - Moods
RENX050 Pete Tong & Superbass - Wonderland
RENX051 John Digweed - Gridlock
RENX051DIGHSX John Digweed - Gridlock (Remixes)
RENX052 Steve Lawler - Courses For Horses
RENX053 James Zabiela - The Perseverance
RENX054 Solaris Heights - No Trace
RENX055 Ralph Falcon - The Dig
RENX056 Umek - Utopia
RENX057 Zoo Brazil & Nic Fanciulli - Ide
RENX058 Future Shock - Tiger Dust
RENX059 Henry Saiz - Artificial Paradises
RENX060 Shlomi Aber - State of No One
RENX061 TG - Creature
RENX062 Christian Smith & John Selway - Updraft
RENX063 Andy Chatterley & Clinton Brown - Sabotage
RENX064 Abyss - Hiccups
RENX065 James Zabiela - Darkness EP
RENX066 Sasha vs. Adam Parker - Highlife EP
RENX067 Dave Seaman - Attack of the Abalones/Wrong Side Business
RENX068 Tom Middleton - One More Tune
RENX069 Yousef feat. Derrick Carter - Legacy
RENX070 Egostereo - Paeonia
RENX071 Patch Park feat. Joeri Jamison - Threshold
RENX072 Various Artists - The Neil Quigley EP
RENX073 Spooky - The Nebula EP
RENX074 Henry Saiz - Madre Noche EP
RENX075 Sahar Z & Audio Junkies - Beyond Detroit
RENX076 Robytek - Tribute To E2-E4 (Sueno Latino)
RENX077 Yousef feat. Derrick Carter - Legacy (Yousef Terrace Remake)
RENX077 Solee - Dubtale/Ice
RENX078 Gui Boratto - Trills
RENX079 Yousef - Afrika
RENX080 Gabe & Marcello V.O.R. - Funky Zeit
RENX081 Jim Rivers - 7 Days
RENX082 Magitman - All Bets Off
RENX083 Spooky - Little Bullet
RENX084 Jack Rose/Bloody Mary - Monaque
RENX085 Henry Saiz - The Rider EP

References

External links
 The new Renaissance Recordings' official website

British record labels
Trance record labels
Record labels established in 1994
English electronic dance music record labels